Bogomil Hristov (born 6 January 1994) is a Bulgarian footballer who currently plays for Botev Ihtiman as a midfielder.

Career
Hristov played for Slivnishki Geroy and Lokomotiv Sofia.

In July 2017, he joined Botev Vratsa but actually signed with Botev Galabovo.

References

External links

1994 births
Living people
Footballers from Sofia
Bulgarian footballers
First Professional Football League (Bulgaria) players
Second Professional Football League (Bulgaria) players
PFC CSKA Sofia players
PFC Slavia Sofia players
FC Bansko players
PFC Spartak Pleven players
FC Lokomotiv 1929 Sofia players
FC Botev Galabovo players
FC Oborishte players
FC Strumska Slava Radomir players
Association football midfielders